iPer (also known as IPER tool) is an educational computer program designed to manage hypertext and hypermedia.

The software was invented in 1996 at Politecnico di Torino and abstracts about its original interface design were published for the first time within the papers of the ED-Media '97 World Conference on Educational Multimedia, Hypermedia, and Telecommunications in Calgary (The EDMedia 97 Paper about Iper).

iPer was probably the first software with a visual approach to hyperlinks, introducing the WYSIWYL interface.

In 1996, the common way to place a Web link was to write:
[[WYSIWYL|The WYSIWYL in Wikipedia]]

In 1996, with iPer, probably for the first time for a Web softwarethe author was able to choose the destination page with a click on a visual preview (a sort of Web browser), without having to type the actual file name or the URL, and without having to be online (connected to the Internet) while performing the various edit on his/her hypertext document.

The first version of iPer required a server extension software (IPERserver), that was available for Unix-based and Windows-based web server platforms.
iPer was then improved; an internal FTP publishing feature was added and so the software became capable of direct Internet publishing.

iPer is the ancestor of the commercial software products Hyper Publish and PaperKiller.

See also
 WYSIWYL
 Hyper Publish
 Politecnico di Torino

Virtual learning environments
Hypertext